Rissoina cerithiiformis is a species of minute sea snail, a marine gastropod mollusk or micromollusk in the family Rissoinidae.

Description

Distribution
This species occurs in the Red Sea and in the Western and Central Pacific.

References

 Vine, P. (1986). Red Sea Invertebrates. Immel Publishing, London. 224 pp.
 Sleurs W.J.M. (1993) A revision of the Recent species of Rissoina (Moerchiella), R. (Apataxia), R. (Ailinzebina) and R. (Pachyrissoina) (Gastropoda: Rissoidae). Bull. K. Belg. Inst. Nat. Wet. 63: 71-135.
 Bosch D.T., Dance S.P., Moolenbeek R.G. & Oliver P.G. (1995) Seashells of eastern Arabia. Dubai: Motivate Publishing. 296 pp.

External links
 

Rissoinidae
Gastropods described in 1887